Arjunan Kadhali is an unreleased Tamil language film directed by Parthe Bhaskar, nephew of composer Ilayaraja who earlier directed Bambara Kannaley. It stars Jai in the lead role with Poorna playing the lead female role. The film began production in 2008 and became delayed after the original producers Ayngaran International suffered financial problems.

Cast 
 Jai as Arjun
 Poorna
 Suzane George
 Thambi Ramiah
 Kalaiyarasan as Ravi

Production 
The film's launch was held in front of the Tiruparankunram Sri Subramaniaswamy temple near Madurai on 25 September 2008 with scenes for a song, "Kan Thiranthan Kandhan", also being shot near the temple. When Srikanth Deva was composing songs on the beaches of Pondicherry he was mobbed by fans and police came to his rescue. In March 2009, the lead actor Jai ran into trouble for making controversial comments about the potential box office fare of his future films. The actor, who was filming for Vaamanan, Aval Peyar Thamizharasi, Adhe Neram Adhe Idam and Arjunan Kadhali at the time, revealed that only Vaamanan would do well and the rest would become financial failures. The producer of this film also revealed he wanted to take action against Jai for "making such irresponsible and damaging statements about his own films." Initially, the council had asked him to complete his pending assignments before he could start work on Venkat Prabhu's Goa, but, the producer of the film, Soundarya Rajinikanth, intervened and bailed Jai out of the ban.

The film progressed slowly and by December 2010, Jai revealed he had finished his portions for the film. Despite finishing production, the film was delayed by distributor Ayngaran International's financial problems and has since remained unreleased. In February 2013, the producer Sivasakthi Pandian was able to censor the film, while the music of the film was released two months later. In 2015, Cheran took up responsibility of releasing the film through his new straight-to-DVD platform of C2H, but the failure of the venture meant that the release of Arjunan Kadhali was delayed.

Soundtrack 
Soundtrack is composed by Srikanth Deva who is the brother-in-law of film's director  while his father Deva composed only one song "Kanthirandhan Kandhan" on the insistence of producer. Lyrics for songs were written by Vaali, Kabilan, Nadhasan and director Parthi Bhaskar himself. The audio was released on 4 April 2013.

References

External links 
 

Films scored by Srikanth Deva
Unreleased Tamil-language films